Missouri Theater or Missouri Theatre may refer to:

Missouri Theater (St. Joseph, Missouri)
Missouri Theatre (Columbia, Missouri)